The men's team road race time trial was a road bicycle racing event held as part of the Cycling at the 1964 Summer Olympics programme. It was held on 14 October 1964. 33 teams of 4 cyclists competed. The course was slightly over 36.6 kilometres long, with 3 laps being required to give a total distance of 109.893 kilometres.

Results

Notes

References

Cycling at the Summer Olympics – Men's team time trial
Road cycling at the 1964 Summer Olympics